Raglan Road can refer to:

"On Raglan Road," an Irish song based on a poem by Patrick Kavanagh
Raglan Road (street), a street in Dublin that gave the poem its name